The subtribe Broscina is a group of beetles in the Broscini tribe of Carabidae (the ground beetles).

Description 
Broscina has eight accepted genera:
 Broscodera: 4 species (see note)
 Broscosoma: 34 species
 Broscus: 2 subgenera; 25 species
 Chaetobroscus: 2 subgenera; 4 species
 Craspedonotus: 3 species
 Eobroscus: 2 subgenera, 4 species
 Miscodera: 1 species
 Zacotus: 1 species

Note: Broscina also contains the Sinobrosculus genus which is in contention and considered doubtful with the three species alternatively being placed in Broscodera.

References 

Insect subtribes